Gonodonta unica, the unica citrus moth, is a species of fruit-piercing moth in the family Erebidae. It is found in North America.

The MONA or Hodges number for Gonodonta unica is 8541.

References

Further reading

 
 
 

Calpinae
Articles created by Qbugbot
Moths described in 1891